MFC 20: Destined for Greatness was a mixed martial arts event held by the Maximum Fighting Championship (MFC) on February 20, 2009, in Enoch, Alberta.

Fight Card

See also
 Maximum Fighting Championship
 List of Maximum Fighting Championship events
 2009 in Maximum Fighting Championship

References

20
2009 in mixed martial arts
Mixed martial arts in Canada
Sport in Alberta
2009 in Canadian sports